Leonard "Len" Weatherrall (born 21 May 1936) was an English professional footballer who played as an inside forward.

References

1936 births
People from Middlesbrough
English footballers
Association football inside forwards
Grimsby Town F.C. players
Weymouth F.C. players
Louth United F.C. players
Goole Town F.C. players
Ross Group F.C. players
English Football League players
Living people